Huiji Temple ( or ), may refer to:

 Huiji Temple (Mount Putuo), on Mount Putuo, in Zhoushan, Zhejiang, China

 Huiji Temple (Nanjing), in Pukou District of Nanjing, Jiangsu, China
 Huiji Temple (Yuanping), in Yuanping, Shanxi, China